Loveday is a given name and surname.

Loveday may also refer to:
 Loveday, South Australia, a settlement
 Loveday, a set of World War II prisoner-of-war camps in Australia
 Loveday Bay (South Australia), a bay
 Loveday (arbitration), a day, in Medieval England, assigned to resolve legal differences under arbitration rather than common law
 Loveday, 1458, a ritualistic reconciliation that took place at St Paul's Cathedral
 Loveday , a series of novels by Kate Tremayne

See also
 Babell or Gelliloveday, a former township of the parish of Ysceifiog, Wales